Samantha Sleeper is an American fashion designer from Highland Park, Illinois  where she graduated from Highland Park High School in 2005. Sleeper earned a BFA, from Parsons The New School of Design in 2009 where she majored in Fashion Design. Her first collection landed the cover of Women's Wear Daily as part of their "Globe Runners" article.

Known for her delicate detailing and commitment to sustainability, the Samantha Sleeper brand maintains a cult following. After launching her Bridal line, it was named a brand to watch by leading bridal publication, the Knot. "Using luxe, eco-conscious materials and couture techniques, she creates pieces that are romantic and ladylike with an edgy, bohemian twist. In her debut collection, she plays with color, classic silhouettes, airy fabrics and lace to create dresses that are effortless, elegant and truly unique." Sleeper often discusses work/life balance after the birth of her son in 2013.

In 2019 Sleeper was included in a Forbes Magazine article titled,"7 Innovative Entrepreneurs Revolutionizing The Wedding Industry" in which Forbes called Samantha Sleeper “the wedding dress whisperer” 

Sleeper is the designer of celebrity wedding dresses including  country singer Carly Pearce  and actress Jamie Hyder.

In 2016 Sleeper launched her second company, Swan Bridesmaid, rooted in sustainability.

References

Living people
Year of birth missing (living people)
Wedding dress designers
American fashion designers